Yuri Vyacheslavovich Kirillov (born 19 January 1990) is a Russian professional footballer who plays for FC KAMAZ Naberezhnye Chelny.

Career
Kirillov made his debut in the Russian Premier League on 3 May 2009 for FC Khimki in a game against FC Kuban Krasnodar. On 22 December 2009 FC Dynamo Moscow have signed 19th-year old midfielder from FC Khimki.
Next seasons Kirillov spent on loan. In the summer 2013, he signed permanent deal with Ural Sverdlovsk Oblast, when the club just returned to Russian Football Premier League. But after making only five appearances in the first half of 2013-2014 season, Kirillov was released in February 2014.

External links

References

1990 births
Living people
Footballers from Ufa
Russian footballers
Russia youth international footballers
Russia under-21 international footballers
Association football midfielders
FC Sportakademklub Moscow players
FC Oryol players
FC Khimki players
FC Dynamo Moscow reserves players
FC Spartak Vladikavkaz players
PFC Krylia Sovetov Samara players
FC Ural Yekaterinburg players
FC Ufa players
FK Atlantas players
FC KAMAZ Naberezhnye Chelny players
FC Dynamo Saint Petersburg players
FC Nizhny Novgorod (2015) players
Russian Premier League players
Russian First League players
Russian Second League players
A Lyga players
Russian expatriate footballers
Expatriate footballers in Lithuania
Russian expatriate sportspeople in Lithuania